Entoloma subcarneum (or Leptonia carnea) is a mushroom native to the Pacific northwest in the United States, belonging to sub-genus Leptonia of genus Entoloma. It is 30–65 mm broad.

References

External links
 
 
 
 

Entolomataceae
Fungi of North America
Taxobox binomials not recognized by IUCN